Traugott Martin von Sauberzweig (October 28, 1863 to April 14, 1920 in Kassel) was a Prussian  Generalleutnant (Lieutenant General) who served on both the Eastern and Western Front in the German Army during World War I. In 1915 he had been Military Governor of Brussels in the days of Edith Cavell's execution, and in connection with this tragedy his name was prominently mentioned. The Cavell case was the reason that von Sauberzweig was supplanted. Among those who had to suffer under his following anger had been Herbert Hoover and his Commission for Relief in Belgium as von Sauberzweig was close to interrupt the services of this organisation. He served as chief of staff on the 8th Army in the Ukraine in 1916 and was awarded the Pour le Mérite on 6 September 1917.

Assignments and Commands (pre-War)
02.1883 Leutnant
04.1911 III. Armeekorps - Berlin  (von Bülow's Chief of Staff)
04.1913 Grenadier-Regiment Prinz Karl von Preußen (2. Brandenburgisches) Nr. 12 - Frankfurt an der Oder  (Cdr)
02.1914 XI. Armeekorps - Kassel  (von Plüskow's Chief of Staff)

Assignments and Commands (during World War I)
08.1914 XI. Armeekorps  =  3. Armee  (von Plüskow's Chief of Staff)
07.1915 III. Reserve-Korps (von Karlowitz' Chief of Staff)
11.1916 8. Armee (von Mudra's Chief of Staff)
07.1917 Heeresgruppe Eichhorn - Wilna (von Eichhorn's Chief of Staff)
09.1917 10. Armee (von Eichhorn's Chief of Staff) (concurrent with above)
07.1918 Generalleutnant
11.1918 Heeresgruppe Gallwitz - Verdun (von Gallwitz' Chief of Staff)
12.1918 38. Infanterie-Division (Commander)

References

Literature
 Karl-Friedrich Hildebrand/Christian Zweng Die Ritter des Ordens Pour le Mérite 1740-1918; 
 Karl-Friedrich Hildebrand/Christian Zweng Die Ritter des Ordens Pour le Mérite des I. Weltkriegs Band 2: H-O, 
 van Wyngarden, G (2006). Early German Aces of World War I, Osprey Publishing Ltd. 
 Formationsgeschichte und Stellenbesetzung der deutsche Streitkraefte 1815 -1990 (1990)

External links
 http://www.krausehouse.ca/krause/EasternFront.htm
 http://home.comcast.net/~jcviser/index.htm/akb/sauberzweig.htm

1863 births
1920 deaths
Lieutenant generals of Prussia
German Army generals of World War I
Recipients of the Pour le Mérite (military class)
Military personnel from Kassel